Hergatz is a municipality in the district of Lindau in Bavaria in Germany. The contemporary town was formed from the former municipalities of Wohmbrechts and Maria-Thann in the course of the municipal reform at the end of the 1970s.

Geography
Hergatz is located in the Westallgäu.

The districts of Grod, Beuren, Möllen, Wohmbrechts and Hergatz are located at the Bundesstraße 12 (federal road 12) Munich - Lindau, approximately 20 km from Lindau. The B 12 forms a cross-town link in Wohmbrechts.

The districts of Grod, Staudach and Handwerks border on the upper Argen, a river, which rises north of Oberstaufen from several brooks, merges with the lower Argen near Neuravensburg and disembogues into Lake Constance near Langenargen. In Muthen the railroad line crosses the small river Leiblach.

The Tyrolean salt road from Bad Reichenhall and Hall in Tirol to Lindau goes through the district of Wohmbrechts.

Culture and infrastructure
In Hergatz the "westallgäuerische" dialect is spoken, with influences of the Swabian dialect.

Transport
Hergatz station, which is on the Buchloe–Lindau and Lindau-Kißlegg lines, is located in the district of Hergatz. Trains leave for Lindau, Aulendorf, Augsburg (through Memmingen) and München (through Kempten) every 1–2 hours. In former times there also were stopping places in the districts of Wohmbrechts and Maria-Thann.

References

External links
 Vacation in Hergatz

Lindau (district)